Magdeburg-Neustadt station is a railway station in the Neustadt district of Magdeburg, capital city of Saxony-Anhalt, Germany.

References

Neustadt